Dag för Dag is a Swedish-American brother and sister duo based in Stockholm. The band's core members are Sarah and Jacob Snavely. Formed in 2007, they are supported both on stage and in the studio by a drummer.

Their first tour was with friends Shout Out Louds in January 2008 and since then they have supported The Kills, Wolf Parade, Lykke Li, Handsome Furs, Wintersleep and Cursive.

The band's name, Dag för Dag, is Swedish for "day by day". Originally taken from a language-learning tape the two stumbled across, the name has come to aptly describe the way they approach music and life in general.

In September 2008 the band recorded a full-length album with Richard Swift. This album was later split in two to form the band's debut 6-song EP, Shooting from the Shadows, that was released in June 2009 on Saddle Creek Europe.

In May 2009 the band performed on BBC 6 Music's Marc Riley show.

In July 2009 the band recorded the remaining tracks for their debut full-length album Boo in Stockholm with Johannes Berglund.

Boo will be released in February 2010 throughout Scandinavia, the UK and Europe. They plan on touring through March of that year, recording in April and May, and then touring through the rest of the year.

External links
 Dag för Dag's Jacob Snavely Fell in Love and Formed a New Band

Swedish rock music groups